Cairns Field is a stadium in Saskatoon, Saskatchewan, Canada.  It is primarily used for baseball and most recently the home of the Saskatoon Yellow Jackets of the Western Major Baseball League until their demise in 2014. The stadium currently does not have a tenant.

Cairns Field features artificial lighting, electronic scoreboard, irrigated and groomed grass infield, excellent drainage, an 8-foot outfield fence with wind screening and dimensions of 335 feet down each line and 400 feet in center field.  The supporting facilities at the field include stands seating 2,000 fans, a clubhouse with four dressing rooms, concession, washrooms, showers, media press box with a public address system, an umpires' room, warm-up mounds and a permanent batting cage.  The ballpark hosted for the 2005 Canadian National Junior Championships.

Tenants

References

Minor league baseball venues
Baseball venues in Saskatchewan